Insane Robots is a rogue-lite, turn-based strategy game developed and published by Playniac. It was released for PlayStation 4, Xbox One, MacOS and Microsoft Windows on July 12, 2018.

Accolades 
The game was nominated for the "Creativity Award" and "Best Strategy Game" at The Independent Game Developers' Association Awards 2018.

External links

References 

Roguelike video games
Turn-based strategy video games
Single-player video games
Indie video games
2018 video games
Windows games
MacOS games
PlayStation 4 games
Xbox One games
Video games about death games
Video games about mental health
Video games about robots
Video games developed in the United Kingdom